The 1994 Polish Speedway season was the 1994 season of motorcycle speedway in Poland.

Individual

Polish Individual Speedway Championship
The 1994 Individual Speedway Polish Championship final was held on 8 October at Wrocław. Tomasz Gollob won the Polish Championship for the third consecutive season.

Golden Helmet
The 1994 Golden Golden Helmet organised by the Polish Motor Union (PZM) was the 1994 event for the league's leading riders. The final was held at Wrocław on the 4 August. Tomasz Gollob once again dominated by scoring a 15 point maximum and then went on to win the Polish Championship.

Junior Championship
 winner - Grzegorz Rempała

Silver Helmet
 winner - Piotr Baron

Bronze Helmet
 winner - Waldemar Walczak

Pairs

Polish Pairs Speedway Championship
The 1994 Polish Pairs Speedway Championship was the 1994 edition of the Polish Pairs Speedway Championship. The final was held on 31 July at Leszno.

Team

Team Speedway Polish Championship
The 1994 Team Speedway Polish Championship was the 1994 edition of the Team Polish Championship. WTS Wrocław, led by Tommy Knudsen, won the gold medal for the second consecutive season.

First Division

Second Division

References

Poland Individual
Poland Team
Speedway
1994 in Polish speedway